Mirpur Khas (Sindhi and ; meaning "Town of the most-high Mirs") is the capital city of the Mirpur Khas District and Mirpur Khas Division in the Sindh province, Pakistan. Mirpur Khas is the 16th largest city in Sindh province and the 80th largest city of Pakistan. The city was built by Talpur rulers of Mankani branch. According to the 2017 Census of Pakistan, its population is 233,916. Mirpur Khas is known for its mango cultivation, with hundreds of varieties of the fruit produced each year - it is also called the “City of Mangoes,” and has been home to an annual mango festival since 1955. After the completion of Hyderabad-Mirpurkhas dual carriage way, the city has become hub of commercial activities.

History

Early 

The Mirpur Khas region has been inhabited for millennia, as evidenced by the excavation of the Buddhist-era settlement of Kahoo Jo Daro. The remnants of stupas still remain. In 712 CE, the region was conquered by the armies of Muhammad Bin Qasim.

Founding 

The Talpur dynasty conquered Sindh in 1784, and under Mir Fath Ali Khan, Sindh was divided into three smaller regions to be ruled by members of the Talpur family. The three regions were centred around Hyderabad, Khairpur, and Mirpur Khas. The Mankani branch of the family under Mir Ali Murad Talpur inherited the region around Mirpur Khas in 1801, and founded the new city of Mirpur Khas in 1806 to serve as the new capital.

Mirpur Khas State

Mir Sher Muhammad Talpur (1829-1843) succeeded Mir Ali Murad, and built a fort in the city when he declared the ruler of the state, and ran a kutchery from within the fort. Elaborate graves for the local rulers were built at Chitorri, and feature a syncretic architectural style that combines elements of Islamic and Rajasthani architecture.

Mirpur Khas remained the capital of the Talpur Mirs of Mirpurkhas until 1843, when Sindh was annexed to British India under the East India Company following the conquest of Sindh by Charles James Napier and defeat of Mir Sher Muhammad Talpur on 24 March 1843 at the battleground of Dubbo. His battle for the Sindh state earned him the moniker "Lion of Sindh."

British 
Later Sindh was made part of the colonial Bombay Presidency and Mirpurkhas was a part of it. Umerkot was made the district's headquarters town of Thar and Parkar district and Mirpur Khas was ignored until the advent of the Luni-Hyderabad branch of the Jodhpur-Bikaner Railway, a subsidiary of the Scinde Railway to the town. The opening of the Jamrao Canal in 1900 made Mirpur Khas stand out of the rest of the towns in the district. It was constituted a municipality in 1901 and the district headquarters was shifted from Umerkot to Mirpurkhas in 1906.

At the turn of the twentieth century, the population of the town was 2,787 with a density of 82 persons per square mile, however the district, as a whole, saw significant growth in the rise of population from 27,866 (1891) to 37,273 (1901). The cotton produced at Mirpur Khas was considered the best in the country when surveyed and the British exploited the produce by exporting it to other nations.

Modern 
After the independence of Pakistan in 1947, because of its proximity with the Indian border, Mirpur Khas became the first city to welcome refugees to Pakistan. It acted as a primary railway junction for the first trains to rail across the Rajasthan to the Sindh province. The Partition of British India resulted in the large-scale exodus of much of the city's Hindu population, though like much of Sindh, Mirpur Khas did not experience the widespread rioting that occurred in Punjab and Bengal. In all, less than 500 Hindu were killed in 
all of Sindh between 1947-48 as Sindhi Muslims largely resisted calls to turn against their Hindu neighbours. Hindus did not flee Sindh en masse until riots erupted in Karachi on 6 January 1948, which sowed fear in Sindh's Hindus despite the fact that the riots were local and regarded Sikh refugees from Punjab seeking refuge in Karachi. Despite the loss of much of the city's Hindu population, Mirpur Khas District is estimated 35% Hindu.

Large numbers of refugees from India began arriving in the city following the Partition of British India - leading to rapid population rises and a shift in demography. In 1951, the population was 40,420, of which 68.42% were Urdu-speaking refugees that had fled India - the highest percentage of any major urban area in Sindh. The population rose further to 60,861 in the 1961 census. The Mirpur Khas tehsil was upgraded to a district and divide the Thar and Parkar district in 1990.

History of Hockey  
Mirza Mansoor Beg was a Senior Superintendent Police Officer and also known as " Baba-e-Hockey. He promoted Hockey in MirPurkhas and organized International Tournament. First time in the History of MirPurkhas Canadian Hockey team played against local team of MirPurkhas. Later on his son, Major masroor Beg, carried on his legacy and arranged historical matches for team.

Geography 
It is located 65 kilometers east of Hyderabad, to which it is connected by Four Lane Dual Carrgiway highway to Hyderabad and by Rail. It is linked to Umerkot by N120 Highway. Karachi is 220 kilometres south-west of Mirpur Khas. The Indian border is located 170 kilometres east of the city.

Demographics 

The city of Mirpur Khas has very different demographics than to the district as a whole. Mirpur Khas MC had a population of 234,133. Mirpur Khas had a sex ratio of 949 females per 1000 males and a literacy rate of 75.62%: 80.27% for males and 70.74% for females. 54,045 (23.08%) were under 10 years of age.

At the time of the 2017 census, 49.31% of the population spoke Urdu, 28.66% Sindhi, 12.15% Punjabi, 4.73% Balochi, 2.19% Pashto and 0.99% Saraiki as their first language.

In late 18th century, many Muslim families were shifted from east Punjab to the area. The biggest Muslim community who settled here was the Arain community. The Arains from various districts of eastern Punjab such as Amritsar, Gurdaspur, Ferozpur, Ambala, Patiala and Jalandhar moved here and permanently settled. Near Mirpur Khas is a disused Sikh temple named the Gurdwara Pehli Patshahi, built on the site where the founder of Sikhism, Guru Nanak, is traditionally believed to have placed his feet.

Education 

The city has many government colleges, mostly affiliated with the University of Sindh.  Mirpur Khas also has a registered PMDC private medical college, Muhammad Medical College and Bhitai Dental and Medical College. Mirpur Khas has a Sindh University campus with five-degree programs: BS-Information Technology, BS-Computer Science, BS-Commerce, BBA, and BS-Geology. The city has numerous schools, both private and public. The number of private schools has increased since last decade. Notable schools are The Vision School Mirpurkhas,Merit palace school,Askhia Progressive Public School, Fauji Faundation Model School, The City School, SZABIST School & college, Little Folks High School, Govt: S.A.L College.The success academy And many more and most famous Bahria foundation college which is a project of pakistan navy

The city is also growing with many tuition centre facilities, especially for IX, X, XI and XII classes and also preparing students for entry tests, mainly the MCAT (Medical College Admission Test) and ECAT (Engineering College Admission Test).

Mirpurkhas city has now its own board for examinations called BISE (Board of Intermediate and Secondary Examinations). Previously Mirpurkhas did not have its own affiliated board for examinations of SSC and HSSC education which is undertaken by government affiliations and registration and number of examination boards development in Pakistan are based according to districts, in which every city/village fall under district are guided for examinations in which the city/village is linked. Mirpurkhas previously fell under District Hyderabad, Sindh.

Besides, Public Libraries in Sindh often appear to receive a dwindling response but in some, with every passing day, the number of readers is increasing. Sindh Government Public Library, Mirpurkhas is one of the best place for readers / scholars of all ages. The Library is situated near Ibn-e-Rushd Girls College, beside Mahar Cinema, Heerabad Mirpurkhas. The facilities in the library are as under:
1. Newspapers & Periodical Section
2. Computer Section
3. CSS Section
4. Stack Section
5. Reading Hall for Boys
6. Ladies & Children Section
7. Art Gallery
8. Bookshop of Culture Department 
9. SMBB Corner

Economy 
Though Mirpurkhas has a small industrial park, no industry is functional there. There are four sugar mills, as well as some cotton ginning, and edible oil mills in the city. The city's economy has been adversely effected by a poor law and order situation, with violent conflict between rival families .

Agriculture 

The district's very fertile land produces wheat, onion, sugarcane, cotton, chillies, and mangoes. Irrigation and farming was revitalised after the Jamrao Canal was built in the 1900s. Afterwards, the city was able to produce and cycle crops to supply mainly grain, cotton products like fabrics, and sugar from the sugarcane cultivation. For a certain period in history, Mirpurkhas enjoyed being the best cotton producer in the country and much of the income of the town came from cotton farming in its heyday.

Nowadays, however, the area is much known its mango produce. The city claims to have 252 different varieties of mangoes, of which the most famous variety is the Sindhri Amb, literally the mango from Sindh. The city boasts its mango products at an annual harvest festival showcasing its world-renowned produce.

Mirpur Khas is positioned atop a fertile land making conditions apt for farming and irrigation. Being connected to the Indus via irrigation canals like the Let Wah, Mirpur Khas has gained an advantage in horticulture and farming over the years. Bananas are also widely cultivated around the region and also one of the biggest producer of bananas in the country.

Railway 

Mirpur Khas Railway Station is in middle of city. After 40 years a railway link between Pakistan and India is being opened again. A broad gauge line has been laid from Mirpurkhas to Khokhrapar, which is the border town from Pakistani Side. The new link now connects Karachi (Pakistan) to Jodhpur (India) by the new train service Thar Express. In 2005, work started on converting the metre gauge railway line to Khokhrapar to broad gauge. Mirpurkhas Railway Station has one of the longest platforms in Pakistan.

Localities
 
 
Lalchandabad

See also 
 Ghulam Muhammad Khan Bhurgri
 Pushpa Kumari Kohli
 Bhurgri
 Chitorri, a historical graveyard with many sandstone tombs of Talpur rulers
 Kahu-Jo-Darro, an ancient Buddhist archaeological site
 Brahma from Mirpur-Khas a famous historic Gupta period image

References

Sources and external links 
 WorldSatesmen - Pakistan - Princely States
 
 

Mirpur Khas District
Populated places in Sindh
Princely states of Pakistan